Coleophora acutiphaga is a moth of the family Coleophoridae. It is found in Spain, France and on Sardinia.

The larvae feed on Juncus acutus.

References

acutiphaga
Moths described in 1982
Moths of Europe